Uday Prakash was an Indian actor who starred in Tamil and Telugu films. He was a football player (team captain) at Sacred Heart College, Tirupattur.

Career
Uday Prakash became famous as he acted in a very important role in Telugu blockbuster Karthavyam starring Vijayashanti. The film also gave him the much boost in Tamil as well, when it was dubbed as Vyjayanthi IPS. Soon he was cast as one of the 3 brothers of Khushbu in Chinna Thambi which also became a blockbuster.

Death
Uday Prakash had the habit of drinking which made his downfall as he lost many opportunities. He had left Chennai due to mounting debts with no work. He was later spotted living in a hut as a hermit along with an old lady who fed him. With the media writing about him the Nadigar Sangham took the responsibility to rehabilitate him. Actor Sarath Kumar gave him an opportunity again in his film Diwan. Uday Prakash told the media that he had kicked the habit of drinking and was looking forward to his new life, but he went back to his old ways. Later he was admitted to the hospital for liver problem. Director P. Vasu' s brother had arranged the money for the treatment. But Uday Prakash left the hospital and reached Nadigar Sangham in a drunken state and collapsed and later died. Napoleon and P Vasu made arrangements for the actor's body to be sent to his birthplace, Ooty.

Partial filmography

References

Male actors in Tamil cinema
1964 births
2004 deaths
People from Ooty